Cosmicomics is a collection of twelve short stories by Italo Calvino first published in Italian in 1965 and in English in 1968. The stories were originally published between 1964 and 1965 in the Italian periodicals Il Caffè and Il Giorno. Each story takes a scientific "fact" (though sometimes a falsehood by today's understanding), and builds an imaginative story around it.  An always-extant being called Qfwfq narrates all of the stories save two. Every story is a memory of an event in the history of the universe. Qfwfq also narrates some stories in Calvino's t zero.

All of the stories in Cosmicomics, together with those from t zero and other sources, are now available in a single volume collection, The Complete Cosmicomics (Penguin UK, 2009).

The first U.S. edition, translated by William Weaver, won the National Book Award in the Translation category.

Contents

The Distance of the Moon, the first and probably the best known story. Calvino takes the fact that the Moon used to be much closer to the Earth, and builds a story about a love triangle among people who used to jump between the Earth and the Moon, in which lovers drift apart as the Moon recedes.
At Daybreak – Life before matter condenses.
A Sign in Space – The idea that the galaxy slowly revolves becomes a story about a being who is desperate to leave behind some unique sign of his existence.  This story also is a direct illustration of one of the tenets of postmodern theory – that the sign is not the thing it signifies, nor can one claim to fully or properly describe a thing or an idea with a word or other symbol.
All at One Point – The fact that all matter and creation used to exist in a single point.  "Naturally, we were all there—old Qfwfq said—where else could we have been? Nobody knew then that there could be space. Or time either: what use did we have for time, packed in there like sardines?"
Without Colors – Before there was an atmosphere, everything was the same shade of gray. As the atmosphere appears, so do colors. The novelty scares off Ayl, Qfwfq's love interest.
Games Without End – A galactic game of marbles back before the universe had formed much more than particles.
The Aquatic Uncle – A tale on the fact that at one stage in evolution animals left the sea and came to live on land.  The story is about a family living on land that is a bit ashamed of their old uncle who still lives in the sea, refusing to come ashore like "civilized" people.
How Much Shall We Bet – A story about betting on the long term evolution of mankind.
The Dinosaurs – How some dinosaurs lived after most of them had become extinct, and how it felt to be that last existing dinosaur in an age where all the current mammals feared his kind as demons.
The Form of Space – As the unnamed narrator "falls" through space, he cannot help but notice that his trajectory is parallel to that of a beautiful woman, Ursula H'x, and that of lieutenant Fenimore, who is also in love with Ursula. The narrator dreams of the shape of space changing, so that he may touch Ursula (or fight with Fenimore).
The Light Years – The unnamed narrator looking at other galaxies, and spotting one with a sign pointed right at him saying "I saw you."  Given that there's a gulf of 100,000,000 light years, he checks his diary to find out what he had been doing that day, and finds out that it was something he wished to hide.  Then he starts to worry.
The Spiral – A story about life as a mollusc, and the nature of love and writing.

All of the stories feature non-human characters which have been heavily anthropomorphized.

See also
Head over Heels
Patema Inverted
Upside Down

Notes

References

External links

Italo Calvino’s Science Fiction Masterpiece, essay on Cosmicomics at The Millions, 25 July 2014

1965 short story collections
Postmodern books
Postmodern novels
Science fiction short story collections
Short story collections by Italo Calvino